Monjas River ("Rio Monjas"; translation:  Nun River) is located in Pichincha Province, Ecuador. It has been associated with environmental problems because of the discharge from nearby factories.

References

Rivers of Ecuador